Keenan Wayne McCardell (born January 6, 1970) is an American football coach and former wide receiver who is the wide receivers coach for the Minnesota Vikings of the National Football League (NFL). He previously served as the wide receivers coach for the Jacksonville Jaguars, University of Maryland, College Park and Washington Redskins.  

McCardell played college football for the University of Nevada, Las Vegas (UNLV) and was drafted by the Washington Redskins in the 12th round of the 1991 NFL Draft. He played for 17 seasons in the NFL and also played for the Cleveland Browns, Jacksonville Jaguars, Tampa Bay Buccaneers, San Diego Chargers and Houston Texans. A two-time Pro Bowl selection, McCardell won two Super Bowl rings, with the Redskins in 1991 and the Tampa Bay Buccaneers in 2002.

Early years
McCardell is the son of Arthur and Mattie McCardell. He attended Waltrip High School in Houston, Texas. He was a three-sport athlete, playing quarterback in football as well as participating in basketball and track.

Playing career

College
McCardell starred at UNLV, where his speed and athleticism enabled him to become one of the premier wide receivers in college football. He left as the school's leading all-time receiver with 141 catches for 2,189 yards (15.5 yards per catch) and 15 touchdowns. He emerged as UNLV's big-play receiver during his junior year, catching 54 passes for 883 yards (16.4 avg.) and five touchdowns, while being named team MVP and becoming the first UNLV receiver to post four consecutive 100-yard games.

National Football League

Washington Redskins
McCardell was selected in the 12th round of the 1991 NFL Draft by the Washington Redskins, but he never took the field in a Redskins' uniform. He, however, got a Super Bowl ring with the Redskins while being on injured reserve. He was cut after the 1991 season.

Cleveland Browns
McCardell signed with the Cleveland Browns in 1992. He saw his first regular season action, but only recorded one reception for eight yards. His 1993 season wasn't much better in terms of catches, but he did score his first professional touchdown. He would record three more before the 1993 season was over. His production steadily increased during his time in Cleveland.  Although he only started five games in 1995, he racked up 56 catches, 709 yards, and four touchdowns. Following the season, he became a free agent. He finished his career with the Browns with 80 receptions for 1,133 yards and eight touchdowns.

Jacksonville Jaguars
McCardell signed a three-year $6 million contract with the Jacksonville Jaguars on March 1, 1996. During his first season with the team he made 85 catches for 1,129 yards and three touchdowns, and earned himself a trip to his first ever Pro Bowl. With the emergence of teammate Jimmy Smith, the Jaguars had one of the best duos at wide receiver in the NFL. They earned the nickname "Thunder and Lightning" with McCardell as "Thunder" because of his ability to run routes in the middle of the field. After the 2001 season, McCardell, along with many other Jaguar starters, were waived due to salary cap reasons. He finished his six-year career with the Jaguars recording 499 receptions for 6,393 yards and 30 touchdowns.

Tampa Bay Buccaneers
McCardell signed with the Tampa Buccaneers before the 2002 season. The Buccaneers would go on to win Super Bowl XXXVII, beating the AFC champion Oakland Raiders 48-21 with McCardell scoring two touchdowns in that game. He became the team's primary receiver late in the 2003 season, making his second Pro Bowl, mainly due to a dispute between receiver Keyshawn Johnson and the Buccaneers organization, which ultimately ended in Johnson being traded to the Dallas Cowboys for Joey Galloway.

McCardell started the 2004 season as a holdout with the Buccaneers after wanting a new contract.

San Diego Chargers
After the dispute with the Buccaneers, McCardell was traded to the San Diego Chargers in exchange for a third- and fifth-round draft pick in the 2005 NFL Draft. In 2005, he was the team's second-leading receiver behind tight end Antonio Gates, totaling 70 catches for 917 yards, and a career-high nine touchdown receptions. On December 4, 2005, in a game against the Oakland Raiders, McCardell became the 13th player in NFL history to record 800 career receptions.

On March 1, 2007, McCardell was released by the Chargers. In three years with the team he totaled 137 receptions for 1,747 yards and 10 touchdowns.

Houston Texans
On July 23, 2007, McCardell signed with the Houston Texans, but was eventually cut on August 31, without playing a game for the team.

Washington Redskins (second stint)
On October 1, 2007, McCardell signed with the Washington Redskins. He played in 10 games, recording 22 receptions for 256 yards and a touchdown.

McCardell finished his career with 883 receptions, which is 13th most all time. He also ranks 23rd in total receiving yardage with 11,373.

Coaching career

Washington Redskins
After coaching the West team wide receivers for the 2010 East-West Shrine Game, McCardell was hired by the Washington Redskins to coach their wide receivers on January 27, 2010. He was fired on January 11, 2012.

Maryland Terrapins
From 2014 to 2015, he served as wide receivers coach for the Maryland Terrapins under head coach Randy Edsall, where he coached current NFL Pro Bowler Stefon Diggs.

Jacksonville Jaguars
On January 20, 2017, McCardell was hired by the Jacksonville Jaguars as their wide receivers coach under head coach Doug Marrone and reuniting with former head coach Tom Coughlin, who served as executive vice president of football operations for the Jaguars.

Minnesota Vikings
On February 9, 2021, McCardell was hired by the Minnesota Vikings as their wide receivers coach under head coach Mike Zimmer, replacing Andrew Janocko, who was promoted to quarterbacks coach. On February 11, 2022, McCardell was confirmed to be staying with the Vikings despite the firing of head coach Mike Zimmer and GM Rick Spielman

Personal life
McCardell and his wife, Nicole, have four children: daughters Keandra, Nia and Nakeeya, and son Keenan II.

References

External links

1970 births
Living people
American Conference Pro Bowl players
American football wide receivers
Cleveland Browns players
Houston Texans players
Jacksonville Jaguars players
Jacksonville Jaguars coaches
Maryland Terrapins football coaches
National Conference Pro Bowl players
San Diego Chargers players
Sportspeople from Houston
Players of American football from Houston
Tampa Bay Buccaneers players
UNLV Rebels football players
Washington Redskins coaches
Washington Redskins players
10,000 receiving yards club
Minnesota Vikings coaches